Fame was built in 1816 at Calcutta. She traded between Britain and India and was wrecked in 1822.

She was listed as being registered at Calcutta in 1819 with W. Eastgate, master, and Palmer & Co., owners. Lloyd's Register (LR) for 1822 showed her with Eastgate, master, Paxton & Co., owners, and trade London–Calcutta.

On 14 June 1822, Fame, Clark, master, wrecked at Sea Point, Table Bay, on passage from Calcutta and Madras for London. Four passengers, four seamen, and some invalided soldiers drowned.

Citations

References
 
 

1816 ships
British ships built in India
Age of Sail merchant ships of England
Maritime incidents in June 1822